The 2024 United States presidential election in Wisconsin is scheduled to take place on Tuesday, November 5, 2024, as part of the 2024 United States elections in which all 50 states plus the District of Columbia will participate. Wisconsin voters will choose electors to represent them in the Electoral College via a popular vote. The state of Wisconsin has 10 electoral votes in the Electoral College, following reapportionment due to the 2020 United States census in which the state neither gained nor lost a seat. Wisconsin is considered to be a crucial swing state in 2024.

Incumbent Democratic president Joe Biden has stated that he intends to run for reelection to a second term.

Primary elections

Republican primary

The Wisconsin Republican primary is scheduled to be held on April 2, 2024.

General election

Polling
Joe Biden vs. Donald Trump

See also 
 United States presidential elections in Wisconsin
 2024 United States presidential election
 2024 Democratic Party presidential primaries
 2024 Republican Party presidential primaries
 2024 United States elections

Notes

Partisan clients

References 

Wisconsin
2024
Presidential